Ed Barnes (born 14 January 1981, in Banbury) is an Ex English rugby union footballer, who plays fly-half for Bristol Rugby.

Barnes started his playing career at Bath before moving to Bedford. He was traded from Plymouth Albion to Bristol Rugby for the 2007–8 season.

Barnes' first game in the Guinness Premiership was made as a replacement against London Wasps where he cleared a penalty to result in a draw. He then made the starting team when playing Wasps for the second time.

In January, 2009 Barnes was selected for the England Saxons team to face .

In early October 2009, Paul Hull announced that Barnes would be out of action for the next six months. Barnes had ruptured his Achilles in Bristol's final game of the 2008/9 season against Leicester. He worked hard over the summer of 2009 to get fit again, only to re-rupture it in the final few weeks of rehabilitation.

References

External links
 Bristol profile

1981 births
Living people
Bristol Bears players
English rugby union players
Plymouth Albion R.F.C. players
Rugby union players from Banbury
Rugby union fly-halves